Evans Evans (born November 26, 1936) is an American actress known for playing the part of Velma Davis in the 1967 film Bonnie and Clyde.

Born in Bluefield, West Virginia, Evans has appeared in over 25 feature film and television projects, including the 1961 Twilight Zone episode  "A Hundred Yards Over the Rim", the 1961 Gunsmoke episode “Harper’s Blood”, the Alfred Hitchcock Presents episode "The Big Score", and the Alfred Hitchcock Hour episode "I Saw The Whole Thing".

Evans Evans appeared as Flirt Conroy in The Dark at the Top of the Stairs at the Music Box Theatre in New York; her role was one of the most memorable performances on Broadway in 1957. She worked with Teresa Wright, Pat Hingle and Sandy Dennis.

Evans married director John Frankenheimer on December 13, 1963; they remained married until his death on July 6, 2002.

Partial filmography 
 All Fall Down (1962) as Hedy
 Grand Prix (1966) as Mrs. Randolph (uncredited)
 Bonnie and Clyde (1967) as Velma Davis
 Story of a Love Story (1973) as Elizabeth
 The Iceman Cometh (1973) as Cora
 Prophecy (1979) as Cellist
 Dead Bang (1989) as Mrs. Gebhardt
 Are You Afraid of the Dark (1994) as The Quiet Librarian

See also 
 List of people with reduplicated names

External links 
 

1936 births
American film actresses
Living people
People from Bluefield, West Virginia
American television actresses
American stage actresses
20th-century American actresses
Actresses from West Virginia
21st-century American women